Louis Cotte (20 November 1740 – 4 October 1815) was a French meteorologist.

1740 births
1815 deaths
French meteorologists
19th-century agronomists
18th-century agronomists